In physics, Torricelli's equation, or Torricelli's formula, is an equation created by Evangelista Torricelli to find the final velocity of a moving object with constant acceleration along an axis (for example, the x axis) without having a known time interval.

The equation itself is:

where
 is the object's final velocity along the x axis on which the acceleration is constant.
 is the object's initial velocity along the x axis.
 is the object's acceleration along the x axis, which is given as a constant.
 is the object's change in position along the x axis, also called displacement.

In this and all subsequent equations in this article, the subscript  (as in ) is implied, but is not expressed explicitly for clarity in presenting the equations.

This equation is valid along any axis on which the acceleration is constant.

Derivation

Without differentials and integration 
Begin with the definition of acceleration:

where  is the time interval. This is true because the acceleration is constant. The left hand side is this constant value of the acceleration and the right hand side is the average acceleration. Since the average of a constant must be equal to the constant value, we have this equality. If the acceleration was not constant, this would not be true.

Now solve for the final velocity:

Square both sides to get:

The term  also appears in another equation that is valid for motion with constant acceleration: the equation for the  final position of an object moving with constant acceleration, and can be isolated:

Substituting into the original equation yields:

Using differentials and integration 
Begin with the definition of acceleration as the derivative of the velocity:

Now, we multiply both sides by the velocity :

In the left hand side we can rewrite the velocity as the derivative of the position:

Multiplying both sides by  gets us the following:

Rearranging the terms in a more traditional manner:

Integrating both sides from the initial instant with position  and velocity  to the final instant with position  and velocity :

Since the acceleration is constant, we can factor it out of the integration:

Solving the integration:

The factor  is the displacement :

From the work-energy theorem 
The work-energy theorem states that

which, from Newton's second law of motion, becomes

See also
 Equation of motion

References

External links 
 Torricelli's theorem

Kinematics
Equations